Contemporary classical may refer to:

 Contemporary classical music, a period or genre of art music
 New Classical architecture, an architectural movement